Gregory John Stanton (born March 8, 1970) is an American lawyer and politician who is the U.S. representative from , serving since 2019. A Democrat, he was previously mayor of Phoenix from 2012 to 2018, and was on the Phoenix City Council from 2000 until 2009.

Stanton was elected mayor in 2011 and reelected in 2015. After then-incumbent U.S. Representative Kyrsten Sinema chose to run for the U.S. Senate, Stanton was elected to the open House seat. In 2020, he was reelected with 61% of the vote. In 2022, he was reelected with 56% of the vote.

Early life, education, and career
Stanton was born in Long Island, New York. His family moved to Arizona and he graduated from Cortez High School in west Phoenix in 1988. He then attended Marquette University and graduated in 1992 with a B.A. in history and political science and was a member of Phi Beta Kappa. In 1995, Stanton earned his J.D. from the University of Michigan Law School. He then worked as an education attorney from 1995 to 2000. In 2014, Stanton became an adjunct professor at Arizona Summit Law School.

Early political career

Phoenix City Council 
Stanton was elected to the Phoenix City Council for 6th district in 2000, 2001, and 2005 and served until 2009. This district included the affluent Phoenix Biltmore Area centered around the Biltmore Fashion Park and Arcadia areas, as well as non-contiguous Ahwatukee.

Mayor of Phoenix 
Stanton was mayor of Phoenix from 2012 to 2018. During his 2011 campaign for mayor, questions arose over the legality of nearly $70,000 in contributions from Stanton's former treasurer Mindy Shields. Stanton opposed the embezzlement prosecution of Shields and fired her in October 2010.

On August 30, 2011, Stanton and Republican candidate Wes Gullett were the top two candidates in the Phoenix mayoral primary, with Stanton getting about 38% of the vote and Gullett 20%.

Stanton advocated against the 2013 federal budget sequestration by meeting with members of Congress multiple times.

Stanton was reelected on August 25, 2015. In 2017, Governing magazine named Stanton one of its Public Officials of the Year for his efforts to expand light rail, bike lanes, and sidewalks while reducing the city's greenhouse gas emissions. Stanton resigned on May 29, 2018, to run for Congress.

U.S. House of Representatives

Elections

2018 

After incumbent Representative Kyrsten Sinema decided to run for the U.S. Senate in 2018, to replace retiring U.S. Senator Jeff Flake, Stanton – who was term-limited as mayor – decided to run for Sinema's seat. He was unopposed in the Democratic primary, and defeated Republican nominee Steve Ferrara 61% to 39% after a campaign during which he stressed his problem-solving experience as mayor.

2020 

In 2020, Stanton was unopposed in the Democratic primary and defeated Republican nominee Dave Giles in the general election with 61% of the vote.

2022 

Stanton ran for reelection in Arizona's 4th congressional district after redistricting and defeated Republican nominee Kelly Cooper in the general election with 56% of the vote.

Committee assignments 

 United States House Committee on Foreign Affairs
 Subcommittee on Western Hemisphere
 Committee on Transportation and Infrastructure
 Subcommittee on Aviation
 Subcommittee on Highways and Transit
 Subcommittee on Water Resources and Environment

Caucus memberships 
New Democrat Coalition
Chair of the Immigration Task Force

Political positions
In an interview a few weeks after the November 2011 mayoral election, Stanton stated his support for repealing the city food tax. He also supported public pension reforms, including more employee contributions to their retirement funds and longer work experience before retirement benefits. In March 2013, Stanton decided against repealing the food tax due to projections that ending the tax would cause layoffs of nearly 99 police officers and 300 other city employees.

As a Representative, Stanton supported the Equality Act, a bill that would expand the federal Civil Rights Act of 1964 to ban discrimination based on sexual orientation and gender identity.

On October 1, 2020, Stanton co-signed a letter to Secretary of State Mike Pompeo that condemned Azerbaijan's offensive operations against the Armenian-populated enclave of Nagorno-Karabakh, denounced Turkey's role in the Nagorno-Karabakh conflict, and called for an immediate ceasefire.

As of November 2022, Stanton had voted in line with Joe Biden's stated position 100% of the time. 

Stanton opposed the 2022 overturning of Roe v. Wade, calling it "a dark, dark day for our country" and saying the Supreme Court had an "extreme, ideological agenda".

Electoral history

Personal life

Stanton is married to Nicole Stanton, an attorney for a cannabis company. They married in 2005 and have two children. They separated in 2016 but were back together as of 2019.

References

External links

 Congressman Greg Stanton official U.S. House website
 Greg Stanton for Congress campaign website

|-

|-

1970 births
21st-century American politicians
Arizona city council members
Arizona lawyers
Democratic Party members of the United States House of Representatives from Arizona
Living people
Marquette University alumni
Mayors of Phoenix, Arizona
University of Michigan Law School alumni
Politicians from Phoenix, Arizona